Batang PX (English: "Fil-American Kid") is a 1997 drama film produced by Star Cinema. The movie was written and directed by Jose Javier Reyes. The film earned several awards and nominations from different award-giving bodies and was also responsible for bringing Patrick Garcia to stardom.

The film tackles domestic violence and the Filipino-American children who were abandoned by their American fathers after the withdrawal of the American forces in the country in the 1990s. The film was restored by the ABS-CBN Film Archives through the film restoration facilities of Central Digital Lab in Makati City.

Synopsis
The Philippines is considered the home of one of the biggest U.S. military bases in the world. It is not surprising that the population of Filipino-American children has risen. Most of them have fathers who abandoned them as soon as these fathers are re-stationed. Amboy, played by Patrick Garcia, is one of the Fil-Am kids patiently anticipating his father's homecoming and yearning to meet him. Stories from Amboy's mom are the only things he knows about his father. His wish is granted when he finally meets his father. However, things don't turn out the way they were planned.

Plot 

A flashback, narrated by Amboy, begins at the young life of his mother Tessie who lived with her abusive and complaining mother in Olongapo City, Zambales, the place where many Fil-Am children abandoned by their American fathers. Tessie was a loner and she hated her mother all the time because of her uncaring, unforgiving, arrogant nature towards her in which Tessie wants to run away from her. One night, she escaped from her abusive mother and was employed as a hostess in a nightclub where she sings for the customers at the red-light district of the city. At that time, she met an American soldier from Baltimore, Maryland named Michael Dahoff whom he fell in love with Tessie. A few months later, Tessie's evil mother arrived at the house where she and the American lived and she violently threatens them by calling the police. Suddenly, Michael went outside to confront her but she endlessly attacks him physically and verbally (for instance, racist) and she blames him for Tessie where she will never forgive her for everything even after her death. While Michael continuously complains to the woman, Tessie was revealed to be pregnant. Later, she gave birth to a baby boy whom Michael named Christopher and his nickname "Amboy" in Manila. Moments later, Michael was reassigned overseas but he promised Tessie and Amboy that he will return someday.

Years later, Amboy, now a teenage boy, lived with his mother Tessie in Manila. One night, they left the apartment in order to avoid being kicked out by the owner because they didn't pay their rent and then, they temporarily live at the house of Tessie's friend Sarah who was surprised by her non-sense. The following day, Tessie rented a house at Aling Cedes' compound where she will pay the rent with advance payments as she promised to her. While living in the new house, Amboy met new friends in the neighborhood including Angela, a young girl of his age and Aling Cedes' granddaughter, and Jessie, Aling Cedes' son who is a young mechanic where Amboy helps. Moments later, Tessie works at the shoe section of a department store but she was angrily complained by her cold-blooded boss due to her hostile attitude towards the customers. While working as a singer at the cabaret, she met Danny, an executive from a car dealership company at her workplace. The two became closer as Danny lived at their house and bought new things for them but Amboy was very hostile towards him. One day, a woman arrived at the compound which is Danny's other woman Monica whom she found out that he lived with another woman but Danny expels her from the scene by getting her inside the taxi as many people in the neighborhood witness everything.

Later, Tessie seriously asks Danny about the woman but she constantly tells the reasons about it until Danny broke a plate which indicates the beginning of domestic abuse. One afternoon, Amboy discovers his bike is missing and he told his friends to find it until they found out that it was stolen by a group of hostile teenagers. As Amboy tried to recover his bike and received threats from them, the thug destroys it completely, leaving Amboy vowed for revenge. On the same day, Danny was summoned by his boss about the computations of the dealership's profits in which he haven't made. The following day, Amboy, along with his friends, retaliates by loosening the tires of the car owned by a thug using the Swiss Army knife. Meanwhile, Danny reveals to Tessie that he was fired by his boss or he will be punished for stealing finances from the company, leaving him to become a jobless man. A moment later, Aling Cedes called Tessie and Danny where they encounter the father of the thug man whom he blames Amboy for destroying the car with a Swiss Army knife that was left in the trail. Seeing that he has gotten too far, Danny punishes Amboy for the trouble he caused, and with the whole neighborhood witnessing their act, Tessie was tearfully shocked and awed. The punishment ended up Amboy having bruises in his eye.

Days later, Danny becomes a violent and alcoholic man whom he slacked off most of the time as Tessie works in her new workplace at the restaurant. A day later, the people from the organization for the Fil-Am children who were left by their American serviceperson parents discovered Amboy and they told him and Tessie that Michael Dahoff returned to the country. The following day, Amboy finally reunites with his American father Michael who is now married and had four children in Baltimore. Later at the household, Amboy received a lot of stuff from his father especially Tessie but she refused to accept it because of her grudge of him abandoning her in the first place. Minutes later, Angela went to Amboy where they converse about his father and his personal problems. Unfortunately, their talk was cut short when a heated confrontation between Danny and Tessie when the former steals money that the latter received from Michael and it got even more violent when Amboy attacks Danny but ended up being locked inside the bathroom and also, Angela and her family tried to end their fistfight but they ended up to witness. The violence ends with Tessie having bruises on her face after she kicked his groin for causing all the trouble. Amboy suggests either expelling Danny out of their house or escaping everywhere but Tessie doesn't agree with it because Danny might get revenge. When Amboy suggested that he will go to his father in the United States, Tessie was mad because she blamed Amboy for ruining her life due to her struggles of raising him, and this left Amboy hurt. The following day, Amboy joins his father to go to Baltimore but he doesn't agree to bring him to America without a reason. After learning he can't go to the US, Amboy leaves the room but Michael stopped him for a bit when he gave dollars to him before he says goodbye to him and he vowed to see him again someday, this leads Amboy to be saddened for the response and accepted.

After Amboy left the hotel and accepts the money from his father, Tessie angrily confronts Danny about her money in her moneybox but the latter tells her to shut up. Tessie got even mad and he started to blame Danny for being a type of bastard when she knew that he stole the money that she hid in her personal belongings. Tessie continues to blame Danny for everything and she calls him a "selfish asshole who doesn't love others" and also, "an addicted drunkard". Danny, who overheard her statements against himself, gets angrier and he starts to destroy every piece of furniture he bought for her including the porcelain and the TV set. The destruction of things led Tessie to want to kick him out and Danny becomes infuriated and he beats her severely. As Amboy goes near to their house, his neighbors tell him about his mother and he immediately runs to his mother who had suffered many bruises on her face. As Amboy goes to her room, Tessie apologizes and hugs her son for everything she had sinned for him, and Amboy promised that he will never leave his mother behind. The following night, a noise was heard in the living room and Amboy unleashes his baseball bat for defense if an intruder was here but Tessie handled it instead. As they go to the living room, they found Danny, who was drunk and currently expelled from the household, in the chair but he woke up when he noticed the two especially Tessie who has a weapon in her hands. Tessie and Amboy tell him that he must go out and never return. Danny retaliates but Tessie seriously threatens to kill him with a baseball bat if he attacks her son and Danny tells her that they will never survive without him. Enraged by his words, Tessie started to attack him and Danny tries to snatch the bat. As Danny tries to kill Amboy, Tessie successfully hits Danny to death with a baseball bat three times although unconscious. The raucous also attracted the attention of Aling Cedes and her family who were shocked by the incident. Aling Cedes finally told them that Danny is a complete psycho in the neighborhood.

In the end, Amboy will remain to be the only male in the family after Tessie promised she will never have another boyfriend. Tessie has found a new job in the salon because she decided to work in the daytime. Amboy continues his studies because she doesn't like to see her son as an uneducated person and also, he continues to help as a mechanic with Jessie and his colleagues in exchange for daily allowances. The film ends with Tessie and Amboy going to the mall after her work shift was done and they will bond together as mother and son.

Cast
 Patrick Garcia as Amboy/Christopher 
 Zsa Zsa Padilla as Tessie
 Edu Manzano as Danny
 Anna Larrucea as Angela
 Nida Blanca as Cedes
 Cherry Pie Picache as Sarah
 Laura James as Young Tessie
 Eula Valdez as Maribeth
 Piolo Pascual as Jessie
 Ogie Diaz as Ramon
 Chubi del Rosario as Macoy
 J.R. Herrera as Chok
 Gilleth Sandico as Laura
 Joshua Spafford as Michael Dahoff
 Don Laurel
 Mon Confiado

Analysis and themes

Release 
The film was released on May 7, 1997. It is the first film of Piolo Pascual for Star Cinema.

After 19 years since its release, the film was restored by the ABS-CBN Film Archives and Central Digital Lab in Makati City. The print of the film is in good condition and the Central Digital Lab restored the film for 345 hours. The restored version was premiered on May 10, 2016 (two days after Mother's Day) and it was attended by the film's stars Zsa Zsa Padilla and Patrick Garcia, cinematographer Ding Achacoso, musical scorer Nonong Buencamino, and assistant director Jerome Pobocan.

Almost two years after the restored version's theatrical release, it also received a free-to-air television premiere on ABS-CBN on May 6, 2018. From the statistics of Kantar Media, the television broadcast of Batang PX received a rating of 3.7 percent, losing to GMA Network's broadcast of Game of Death II in which it received a rating of 4.3 percent.

Awards
Patrick Garcia
 Movie Actor of the Year - Star Awards
 Best Performer - Young Critics Circle Awards
 Best Actor Nominee - FAP Awards
 Best Actor Nominee - Gawad Urian Awards
 Teenage Actor of the Year - Guillermo Mendoza Memorial
 Best Young Performer - Parangal ng Bayan
 German Moreno Youth Achievers Awardee - FAMAS Awards
 Favorite Actor of the Year - People's Choice Awards 
Others
 Young Critics Circle Awards - Best Film
 Star Awards Actress of the Year: Zsa Zsa Padilla
 Star Awards Editor of the Year: Danny Gloria
 Star Awards Original Screenplay of the Year: Jose Javier Reyes
 Gawad Urian Best Actress (Pinakamahusay na Pangunahing Aktres): Zsa Zsa Padilla

References

Notes

External links
 

Philippine drama films
1997 films
Tagalog-language films
Filipino-language films
Star Cinema films